Elflein is a surname. The name derives from the old Anglo-Saxon given name Ælflin. The name is composed of the elements 'aelf', elf, and 'wine', friend; these were frequently used elements in Anglo-Saxon compound personal names, such as 'Ælfwig', elf-battle, and 'Æthelwine', noble-friend. 'Ælfwine' is recorded in the Domesday Book of 1086 as 'Aeluuin', 'Alfuuinns', 'Aluuinus' and 'Eluuin', while one 'Goduine Ælfuini filius' (Godwin son of Aelfwine) appears in the 1095 Feudal Documents of the Abbey of Bury St. Edmunds, Suffolk. One Anne Elfelin married Nathaniel Whitel in Lincolnshire in December 1628, and James Elflain was christened at St. Luke's, Finsbury, London, on November 28th 1819.

In the German town of Volkach there is a long-established Elflein family of winegrowers, whose surname changed from the 16th to the 17th century from first Elbla, then to Elcklein and later to Elflein. According to the church register books, the associated name Elbla comes from Dittersdorf, probably today's Wielowies, near the town of Elblag in Poland. Therefore, the probable origin of the name of the Elfleins from Volkach is a late medieval Germanization of the Polish surname Elbląg.

Notable people with the surname include:

Ælflin (ca. 978), Anglo-Saxon monk and scribe of notable historical and scriptural works.
Ada María Elflein (1880–1919), Argentine poet, columnist, translator, feminist and teacher
Pat Elflein (born 1994), American football guard

See also 
 Das Christ-Elflein (The Little Elf of Christ), is an opera in two acts by Hans Pfitzner

References